The Russia national rugby league team (also known as The Bears) represent Russia in international rugby league tournaments and other rugby league fixtures. The Bears, played their first fixtures against two British club sides: York Wasps and Fulham RLFC. In 2013, Russia became a full member of the Rugby League International Federation. 

After the 2022 Russian invasion of Ukraine, the International Rugby League and European Rugby League banned Russia from all international rugby league competitions.

History

1990s
The Russia Bears were formed in 1991 for a tour of two English teams, the York Wasps and Fulham RLFC. The Bears played their first overseas match in 1991 against the French national team at the Stade Georges Lyvet, Villeurbanne on Sunday, 27 October 1991. The Bears were beaten 26-6 by France. Later that year, the Bears toured South Africa to play a three-match series against South Africa.

2000s
The 2000 RLWC provided the Bears with the opportunity to compete with the international heavyweights of rugby league: England and Australia. Also in their group was Fiji, who the Bears played first up in Barrow. Led by Sydney Roosters prop Ian Rubin, who was born in Odessa, Ukraine, the Bears were involved in a tight struggle and it was Fijian captain, winger Lote Tuquri, who proved to be the difference between the two sides, with Fiji winning 38-12. The next two games were against opponents who proved to be beyond the Russians, with two big defeats at the hands of the English national team and a record 110-4 defeat by the Australians.

The Russian side went on a four-match tour of New Zealand's south island in 2004.

In 2006, Russia were involved in Europe Round One, defeating Netherlands national rugby league team and Serbia national rugby league team to finish second and keep their World Cup dream alive. They then went through to Europe Round Two in Europe Pool Two with Ireland and Lebanon. Russia lost all 4 games against them and did not qualify on those grounds.

2010s
In 2010, after a year out of competition, the Bears competed in the Rugby League European Shield, topping the table after wins against Ukraine and Latvia. In 2011 Russia were involved in the European qualifying group that featured Russia themselves, Italy, Serbia, and Lebanon. They lost both of their games against Italy and Lebanon ultimately ending their dreams for a second world cup tournament. In 2012-2013, the Bears competed in the Rugby League European Shield  winning five games out of six to take the shield.

Russia participated in the qualification for the 2017 Rugby League World Cup. In the final round of qualification, Russia took on Spain at Fili Stadium in Moscow, and Ireland in Bray, in a bid to qualify for their second World Cup appearance.

2020s

After the 2022 Russian invasion of Ukraine, the International Rugby League and European Rugby League banned Russia from all international rugby league competitions.

Players

Current squad
Squad selected for the 2021 World Cup qualifying fixtures;
Nikolai Zagoskin
Iustin Petrushka
Kirill Bozhko
Sergei Muntian
Kirill Kosharin
Petr Botnarash
Ivan Troitskii
Igor Abramov
Vladislav Lesnikov
Denis Tiulenev
Dmitrii Leskov
Aleksandr Lysokon
Alexandr Naumov
Dmitry Bratko
Viacheslav Eremin
Viktor Ariutkin
Andrey Kuznetsov
Ilia Danilov
Pavel Mrachkovskii
Denis Chuprin
Igor Chupin
Boris Voloskov
Sergey Konstantinov
Sergei Zhigan
Anton Kuklin
Evgenii Orlov
Andrei Lavrushin
Andrei Perin
Nikita Kuznetsov
Dmitrii Tarasenkov
Aleskei Leonov
Egor Shustov
Ivan Kazantsev
Vsevolod Gusev

Tournament history
Russia has participated in:
 Emerging Nations Tournament (1995)
 World Cup (2000)
 World Sevens (1992 as the "Red Arrows", 1994-2003)
 Victory Cup (2003, 2004)

Record
Below is table of the official representative rugby league matches played by Russia at test level up until 6 October 2021:

Results and fixtures

See also

 Rugby league in Russia
 Russia women's national rugby league team
 Victory Cup
 European Nations Cup
 Emerging Nations Tournament
 World Cup

References

External links

https://www.rlef.eu.com/fixtures?page=1